Thalaiyar Falls, also known as Rat Tail Falls is a waterfall Located in the Theni District,which flows as Manjalar River, one of the tributaries of Vaigai river which flows in the south of Tamil Nadu State, South India.

Description
It appears across the valley as a long thin white strip of cascading water on a background of black rock cliff face that juts out of the foothills. 

The very edge at the top of the Falls has a low concrete wall on either side concentrating the flow of water to focus the falls into a better rat tail shape. One can walk along the wall and get near the center of the falls. One can get down to the edge of the rock to look directly straight down to see a little river at the bottom continuing placidly through the forest. Looking back up to the side, one can watch the water in freefall, mostly silent. The noise of the crashing water below doesn't rise up. The only noise is the water pushing around the stone walls, and some smaller falls just upstream. 

Access

Rat Tail Falls is considered inaccessible to the general public, as there is no road to it. The top of the falls is a rewarding and challenging hike destination. Hikers should be cautious, as two Western tourists died in 2006 when they fell from the top of the Falls.

It is possible to hike to the bottom of the falls in the dry season, beginning at the Manjalar Dam. This difficult hike proceeds along a path through Mango orchards and potato fields around the Manjalar Reservoir and up along the stream as far as a small shrine, dedicated to the Goddess Kamakshi. The legend is that Kamakshi was born here at the foot of the falls in a bamboo bush and hence she is called Moonkilanai Kamakshi. This place is called Amma Machhu, meaning in the middle of a grove of teak trees. 

The return hike is more difficult.

External sources
Top of the falls (part of Rattail Falls gallery)
Base of the falls - 1, Photos
Base of the falls - 2, Photo

References

See also
Waterfalls in Palani Hills Wildlife Sanctuary and National Park
List of waterfalls in India
List of waterfalls in India by height

Waterfalls of Tamil Nadu
Horsetail waterfalls